Estelle May Thompson (1930–2003) was an Australian crime fiction writer, author of 16 novels and one biographical memoir. Her crime thrillers have been published worldwide in hardcover and paperback, most also in large print editions, Braille and/or as audio cassettes. Five have been translated.

Life
Thompson was born 9 October 1930 in Gympie, Queensland to Andrew Thompson, a dairy farmer of Irish descent, and his wife Lillias May (née Nahrung). She said that she wrote in her spare time whilst living on the family farm at Nambour near Brisbane.

Three of Thompson's novels where nominated for the Miles Franklin Literary Award: The Lawyer and the Carpenter in 1963; The Edge of Nowhere in 1965; and The Wrong Saturday in 1968.

Thompson's sixth novel, Find a Crooked Sixpence, was serialised in The Australian Women's Weekly.

Thompson's death on 28 May 2003 was reported in the Brisbane Courier Mail as "late of Dulong".

Publications
 A Twig is Bent, Abelard-Schuman, 1961
 The Lawyer and the Carpenter, Hodder & Stoughton, 1963
 The Edge of Nowhere, Hodder & Stoughton, 1965
 The Glass Houses, Hodder & Stoughton, 1967
 The Wrong Saturday, Hodder & Stoughton, 1968, 
 Find a Crooked Sixpence, Hodder & Stoughton, 1970; Walker, 1977, 
 A Mischief Past, Hale, 1971, 
 Three Women in the House, Hale, 1973, 
 The Meadows of Tallon, Hale, 1974, 
 Hunter in the Dark, Walker, 1978; Walker & Co, 
 To Catch a Rainbow, Hale, 1979, 
 The Heir to Fairfield, Robert Hale, 1983, 
 A Bridge Over Time : Living in Arnhemland with the Aborigines, 1938-1944 from the memories of Harold Thornell, J M Dent, 1986, ; & Robert Hale, 1986, 
 A Toast to Cousin Julian, Hale, 1986, 
 The Substitute, Robert Hale, 1991, ; re-published as Death by Misadventure, St Martin’s Press, 1992; Worldwide, 1993, 
 Come Home to Danger, Robert Hale, 1998, 
 The Road to Seven-Thirty, Robert Hale, 2000,

Translations
 A Twig is Bent
Was du nicht weisst, macht dich nicht tot, (German edition) Scherz, 1982, 
Le verger de la peur : roman, (French edition) Les Editions Mondiales, 1962

 The Wrong Saturday
De fatale zaterdag, translated into Dutch by J. C. Torringa-Timmer, Davidsfond, 1974, 
Lourd de menaces, translated into French by C. Wourgaft, Gallimard, 1970

 Three Women in the House
Tödlicher Hass : Roman, (German edition) Wilhelm Heyne, 1975, 

 The Meadows of Tallon
Eine feine Familie, translated into German by Ingrid Herrmann, Scherz, 1982, 

 Hunter in the Dark
Der blinde Jager, (German edition) Scherz, 1982,

References

External links
 Archived Review: Estelle Thompson - Hunter in the Dark

1930 births
2003 deaths
Australian crime writers
20th-century Australian novelists
Women mystery writers
People from Queensland
20th-century women writers